McGarry is a surname of Irish origin meaning "the son of Fearadhach." It is the 422nd most common surname in Ireland, and 722nd in Scotland.

List of people surnamed McGarry
Andrew McGarry (born 1981), English cricketer
Anna McGarry (1894–1978), leading U.S. advocate in interracial justice and veteran social action leader
Bill McGarry (1927–2005), English international football player and manager
Chris McGarry (born 1966), American actor
Christi McGarry, Filipina-American beauty pageant titleholder from Jersey City, New Jersey
Colin McGarry (born 1965), Northern Irish professional darts player
David McGarry, American musician, singer, voice actor, music producer, and composer
Fearghal McGarry (born 1971), an Irish historian 
Flynn McGarry (born 1998), American chef
James McGarry (hurler) (born 1971), Irish hurling player 
Jean McGarry, author of fiction and Professor in the Writing Seminars program at Johns Hopkins University
John McGarry (born 1957), Northern Irish political scientist 
Kathleen M. McGarry, Professor of Health Economics at the University of California, Los Angeles 
Kathryn McGarry, Canadian politician, Mayor-elect of Cambridge, Ontario, formerly a critical care nurse 
Kelly McGarry (1982-2016), professional New Zealand freeride mountain biker and X-Games athlete
Mac McGarry (born 1926), host of the U.S. television quiz show It's Academic
Mary McGarry Morris (born 1943), American novelist, short story author and playwright
Michael McGarry (born 1965), New Zealand international soccer player
Moses Elijah McGarry (1878–1949), physician and political figure in Nova Scotia, Canada
Natalie McGarry (born 1981), Scottish politician 
Niall McGarry (born 1978), Irish businessman
Patsy McGarry, Religious Affairs correspondent of The Irish Times in the Republic of Ireland
Peter J. McGarry (1871–1940), New York politician
Robert McGarry IV (born 1985), collegiate American football player
Ron McGarry (born 1937), English professional footballer who played centre forward for a number of clubs
Ryan McGarry (born c. 1983) ER doctor and documentary film-maker
Sandy McGarry (born 1961) South Carolina House of Representatives member
Seán McGarry (fl. 1908–1925), Irish nationalist and politician
Steve McGarry (born 1953), British cartoonist
Steven McGarry (born 1979), Scottish professional footballer
Thomas McGarry, early 20th-century Canadian politician
Tim McGarry (born 1964), Northern Irish actor and comedian

Fictional characters
Leo McGarry, character played by John Spencer on the television serial drama The West Wing

See also
McGarry, Ontario, township in Timiskaming District in the Canadian province of Ontario

References

Surnames of Irish origin